Bendere Opamo Oboya (born 17 April 2000) is an Australian athlete. She competed in the women's 400 metres event at the 2019 World Athletics Championships. At the 2020 Tokyo Olympics, Oboya competed in both the women's 400 meters and was a member of the Australian team that competed in the women's 4 x 400 meter relay. She came fifth in her individual event in her heat and was eliminated. As a member of the team of Ellie Beer, Kendra Hubbard and Annaliese Rubie-Renshaw they finished 7th in their heat and did not contest the final.

Early life
Oboya arrived in Australia in 2003 aged three with her family including five siblings. She participated in athletics when only very young at Blacktown Little Athletics. When she was 16 years old she went on a school athletics trip to Canada. This encouraged her to take her athletics career more seriously, found a coach and started training. She has stated that she enjoyed her childhood growing up in Pendle Hill, New South Wales, in Sydney's west.

Athletics career
Her talent was already visible at school when she quickly rose up the ranks. At the 2017 Commonwealth Youth Games, she won the gold medal at 400 metres. At the 2019 World Athletics Championships – 400 metres, she reached the semi-finals.

She nearly quit the sport due to mental health issues after a tumultuous 2019 and a bitter split from her former coach. John Quinn, who is a well-respected sprints coach, became her mentor. Quinn stated that Bendere Oboya is a role model because of her humility. As of January 2021, she is Australia’s women's 400 metres champion (Sydney Track Classic). She was Australia’s only sprinter to have run a qualifying time for the Tokyo Olympics.

References

External links
 

2000 births
Living people
Australian female sprinters
World Athletics Championships athletes for Australia
Australian Athletics Championships winners
Ethiopian emigrants to Australia
Sportspeople from Gambela Region
Sportswomen from New South Wales
Athletes (track and field) at the 2020 Summer Olympics
Olympic athletes of Australia
Olympic female sprinters
21st-century Australian women